Nancy Robertson may refer to:

Nancy Robertson (actress), Canadian actress
Nancy Robertson (diver) (born 1949), Canadian Olympic diver
Nancy Robertson (WRNS officer) (1909–2000), British Royal Navy officer